The Frank Sinatra Show may refer to these broadcasts starring Frank Sinatra:

 The Frank Sinatra Show (1950 TV series)
 The Frank Sinatra Show (1957 TV series)
 The Frank Sinatra Show (radio program), several radio musical programs in the U.S.
 The Frank Sinatra Timex Show: Here's to the Ladies, a 1960 TV special
 The Frank Sinatra Timex Show: Welcome Home Elvis, a 1960 TV special

See also
Frank Sinatra#Television and radio career